Nelson Walter "Fogata" Demarco Riccardi (6 February 1925 – 21 July 2009) was a basketball player from Uruguay, who competed in three Olympics. At the 1948 Summer Olympics, Demarco and team Uruguay placed 5th in the Olympics. Demarco won a bronze medal at both the 1952 Summer Olympics and the 1956 Summer Olympics.

His remains are buried at Cementerio del Norte, Montevideo.

References

External links

 Obituary 

1925 births
2009 deaths
Sportspeople from Montevideo
Basketball players at the 1952 Summer Olympics
Basketball players at the 1956 Summer Olympics
Basketball players at the 1948 Summer Olympics
Olympic basketball players of Uruguay
Olympic bronze medalists for Uruguay
Uruguayan men's basketball players
Olympic medalists in basketball
Burials at the Cementerio del Norte, Montevideo
Medalists at the 1956 Summer Olympics
Medalists at the 1952 Summer Olympics
1954 FIBA World Championship players